Rural Denmark and Its Lessons is a non-fiction book by H. Rider Haggard based on his tour of Denmark.

References

External links
Complete book at Internet Archive

1911 non-fiction books
Works by H. Rider Haggard
Books about Denmark